Athol Memorial Hospital, now called Athol Hospital, is a hospital in Athol, Massachusetts. It was founded in 1950 by Addison Sawyer, who was an inventor.  He had donated money to the cause of the hospital's establishment.  Athol was named in honor of Athol soldiers who died during World War II. With over 25 beds and a 24-hour Emergency Department, it serves Athol, Erving, New Salem, Orange, Petersham and other surrounding areas.

References

External links
 

1950 establishments in Massachusetts
Hospitals in Worcester County, Massachusetts
Athol, Massachusetts